The 1959 Wichita Shockers football team, sometimes known as the Wheatshockers, was an American football team that represented Wichita  University (now known as Wichita State University) as a member of the Missouri Valley Conference during the 1959 NCAA University Division football season. In its third and final season under head coach Woody Woodard, the team compiled a 5–4–1 record (1–2–1 against conference opponents), finished in fourth place out of five teams in the MVC, and outscored opponents by a total of 181 to 161. The team played its home games at Veterans Field, now known as Cessna Stadium.

Schedule

References

Wichita
Wichita State Shockers football seasons
Wichita Shockers football